Death Comes to Pemberley is a three-part British television drama based on the best-selling 2011 P.D. James novel of the same name. Her murder mystery was based on the style and characters of Jane Austen's 1813 novel Pride and Prejudice.

The series was commissioned by Controller of BBC Drama Commissioning Ben Stephenson and then-Controller of BBC One Danny Cohen, and was first broadcast from 26 to 28 December 2013 on BBC One.

Premise
It is June 1803, six years after the marriage of Mr. Fitzwilliam Darcy and Miss Elizabeth Bennet, as recounted in Pride and Prejudice. One evening, George Wickham and his wife Lydia (Elizabeth's sister) are travelling by carriage to Pemberley for a ball with Captain Denny. Wickham and Denny have an argument, and leave the carriage in anger. The two men disappear into the woodland, where Lydia hears two gunshots. After being informed, Darcy sends out a search party, who find Wickham distraught and hysterical, holding Denny's body and  blaming himself for his murder.

Cast

 Matthew Rhys as Fitzwilliam Darcy
 Anna Maxwell Martin as Elizabeth Darcy
 Jenna Coleman as Lydia Wickham
 Matthew Goode as George Wickham
 Trevor Eve as Sir Selwyn Hardcastle
 Alexandra Moen as Jane Bingley
 Rebecca Front as Mrs Bennet
 James Fleet as Mr Bennet
 Penelope Keith as Lady Catherine de Bourgh
 Joanna Scanlan as Mrs Reynolds
 Tom Ward as Colonel Fitzwilliam
 Eleanor Tomlinson as Georgiana Darcy
 James Norton as Mr Henry Alveston
 Nichola Burley as Louisa Bidwell
 Philip Martin Brown as Mr Bidwell
 Kevin Eldon as Dr McFee
 Jennifer Hennessy as Mrs Bidwell
 Lewis Rainer as Will Bidwell
 Mariah Gale as Mrs Younge
 Teresa Churcher as Mrs Piggott
 Tom Canton as Captain Martin Denny
 Oliver Maltman as George Pratt
 David Blockley as Footman

Production

Casting
The cast was announced on 18 June 2013. The series was cast by Gary Davy. Actor Tom Ward, who plays Colonel Fitzwilliam, is the only cast member to have previously played a role in an adaptation of Pride and Prejudice. He played Lt Chamberlayne in the 1995 BBC adaptation.

Filming
Filming began in June 2013 on location in Yorkshire and Derbyshire and has been supported with investment from Screen Yorkshire. Chatsworth House in Derbyshire was used as the exterior of Pemberley, and rooms at Chatsworth and at Castle Howard and Harewood House, both in Yorkshire, were used for indoor scenes. Areas of National Trust land, including Hardcastle Crags, Fountains Abbey and the Studley Royal estate and Treasurer's House, were also used in filming. Beverley's Guildhall provided the location for a courtroom. The gallows scenes were filmed on a purpose-built scaffold outside York Crown Court, with Wickham emerging from the gate to the old debtors' prison in the York Museum.

Episodes

Reception
The Guardian described the tone of the first episode as respectful of Austen's original, but "not afraid to stand out and be its own very different thing as well", describing it as a "mashup" between period drama and Agatha Christie or Midsomer Murders. A later Guardian review described the series as "pretty much perfect Christmas TV", praising the appearance of the series and the "satisfying plot". Lina Talbot, writing for The Independent, praised the casting of Mr and Mrs Bennet. The Radio Times praised the production values of the piece, and noted that they were supported by a "meaty" plot.

References

External links
 Cano-López, Marina. Review Death Comes to Pemberley (TV series). CRITICKS: The British Society for Eighteenth Century Studies. 14 February 2014. https://web.archive.org/web/20140227004003/http://www.bsecs.org.uk/criticks/ReviewDetails.aspx?id=181&type=4
 
 

2010s British drama television series
2010s British television miniseries
2013 British television series debuts
2013 British television series endings
BBC high definition shows
BBC television dramas
BBC television miniseries
British crime television series
English-language television shows
Fiction set in 1803
Historical mystery television series
Television series based on Pride and Prejudice
Television series set in the 1800s